SC Condor Hamburg is a German association football club from the city of Hamburg. The club was formed 13 July 1956 by former members of Farmsener Turnverein. A multi-sport club, Condor has departments for bowling, boxing, dancing, gymnastics, handball, Karate, Nordic Walking, tennis, table tennis, and volleyball. Between 1977–85 the club also had an ice hockey team that played at the Regionalliga (IV) level.

History
Through the 1970s and 1980s SC Condor was a sixth-division side, until advancing to fifth-tier play in the 1990s. They played a single season in the fourth-division Oberliga Hamburg/Schleswig-Holstein in 1996–97. SC Condor also made an appearance in the opening round of the DFB-Pokal (German Cup), where they lost 4–0 to SG Wattenscheid 09. Since 2007 they have been part of the Oberliga Hamburg (V) or Hamburgliga which became a fifth-tier circuit after the introduction of the 3. Liga in 2008.

Honours 
The club's honours:
 Verbandsliga Hamburg (V): 1996
 Landesliga Hamburg (VI): 1983, 1991
 Hamburg Cup: runners-up 2014, 2015

References

External links 

Das deutsche Fußball-Archiv historical German domestic league tables 

Condor
Association football clubs established in 1956
1956 establishments in Germany